Sadali, Sàdali in sardinian language, is a comune (municipality) in the Province of South Sardinia in the Italian island  of Sardinia.

Geography
Sadali borders the following municipalities: Esterzili, Nurri, Seui (Province of Ogliastra), Seulo, and Villanova Tulo.

References

Cities and towns in Sardinia